These are the official results of the Women's 800 metres event at the 1999 IAAF World Championships in Seville, Spain. There were a total number of 37 participating athletes, with five qualifying heats, two semi-finals and the final held on Tuesday 24 August 1999 at 21:00h.

Coming into the final turn, converted American sprinter Jearl Miles Clark held a microscopic lead on the inside with 1993 champion Maria Lurdes Mutola virtually even on her shoulder.  Double reigning Olympic champion Svetlana Masterkova was chasing on the outside with Ludmila Formanová boxed on the inside behind Clark.  Clark kept Mutola on the outside throughout the turn.  Coming off the turn, the action began.  Clark injected her sprinter's speed, pulling away from Mutola for a few strides.  At the same time, Masterkova pulled out to lane 3 to get running room on Mutola.  This freed Formanová who went behind Masterkova and out to lane 4 for running room.  50 metres out it was three abreast with Formanová trailing, but Clark couldn't hold the lead and faded.  Mutola and Masterkova moved past, but Masterkova couldn't get past Mutola.  As Mutola edged into the lead, she looked to be headed for her second championship but Formanová ran around Masterkova and in full sprint, passed Mutola 5 meters out for the win.

Final

Semi-final
Held on Sunday 22 August 1999

Heats
Held on Saturday 21 August 1999

References

 

H
800 metres at the World Athletics Championships
1999 in women's athletics